La Canonja is a municipality of the comarca of Tarragonès, in the province of Tarragona, in Catalonia, Spain. La Canonja was segregated from Tarragona on 15 April 2010 by a decision of the Parliament of Catalonia. It borders with Tarragona, Reus and Vila-seca.

References

External links
La Canonja Council web page
 Government data pages 

Municipalities in Tarragonès
Populated places in Tarragonès